Kevin Yan may refer to:

 Yan Yikuan, Chinese actor and singer
 Yan Zidong, Chinese actor and singer

See also
 Kévin Yann, French footballer